Acrotona austiniana is a species of rove beetle in the family Staphylinidae. It is found in North America.

References

Further reading

 
 
 
 
 
 
 
 
 

Aleocharinae
Beetles described in 1910